Drepanis is a genus of Hawaiian honeycreeper in the subfamily Carduelinae of the family Fringillidae.

The birds are endemic to Hawaii.

Species
It contains the following species:

See also
 
 

 
Hawaiian honeycreepers
Endemic fauna of Hawaii
Bird genera
Bird genera with one living species
Higher-level bird taxa restricted to the Australasia-Pacific region